Buangor is a closed station located in the town of Buangor, on the Ararat railway line in Victoria, Australia. The station was one of 35 closed to passenger traffic on 4 October 1981 as part of the New Deal timetable for country passengers.

References

External links
 Melway map at street-directory.com.au

Disused railway stations in Victoria (Australia)